Gladesville was an electoral district of the Legislative Assembly in the Australian state of New South Wales was created in 1981 replacing Fuller. It included the Sydney suburb of Gladesville. It was abolished in 1999 and was replaced by Ryde.

Members for Gladesville

Election results

References

Former electoral districts of New South Wales
1981 establishments in Australia
1999 disestablishments in Australia
Constituencies established in 1981
Constituencies disestablished in 1999